Micragone is a genus of moths in the family Saturniidae. The genus was erected by Francis Walker in 1855.

Species
Micragone agathylla (Westwood, 1849)
Micragone allardi Darge, 1990
Micragone ansorgei (Rothschild, 1907)
Micragone bilineata (Rothschild, 1907)
Micragone camerunensis (Strand, 1909)
Micragone cana Aurivillius, 1893
Micragone colettae Rougeot, 1959
Micragone ducorpsi (Fleury, 1924)
Micragone elisabethae Bouvier, 1930
Micragone flammostriata Rougeot, 1979
Micragone gaetani Bouyer, 2008
Micragone herilla (Westwood, 1849)
Micragone joiceyi Bouvier, 1930
Micragone leonardi Bouyer, 2008
Micragone lichenodes (Holland, 1893)
Micragone martinae Rougeot, 1952
Micragone mirei Darge, 1990
Micragone morettoi Darge, 2001
Micragone morini Rougeot, 1977
Micragone nenia (Westwood, 1849)
Micragone nenioides Rougeot, 1979
Micragone neonubifera Rougeot, 1979
Micragone nubifera Rougeot, 1979
Micragone nyasae Rougeot, 1962
Micragone remota Darge, 2005
Micragone rougeriei Bouyer, 2008
Micragone trefurthi (Strand, 1909)

References

Saturniinae